Alice Nordin (4 May 1871 – 26 May 1948) was a Swedish sculptor. 

After leaving the Royal Swedish Academy of Fine Arts, Nordin studied in Paris before traveling around Europe. Stories of her travels were published in Idun magazine.

In 1911, she became the first female sculptor to have an exhibition at Konstnärshuset. In 1925, Nordin became the first female artist to receive the Swedish Royal medal Litteris et Artibus. Her work was part of the sculpture event in the art competition at the 1932 Summer Olympics.

Gallery

References

External links
 

1871 births
1948 deaths
20th-century Swedish sculptors
Swedish women sculptors
Olympic competitors in art competitions
Artists from Stockholm
Burials at Norra begravningsplatsen
Litteris et Artibus recipients